The US Climate Reference Network (USCRN) is a network of climate stations developed and maintained by the National Oceanic and Atmospheric Administration (NOAA), completed in 2008.. It has the long-term commitment of the Department of Commerce and the NOAA.

As of 2012, it has 114 automated stations at 107 locations.

Project

Overview 
The USCRN is made up of over 143 stations in the United States. Its purpose is to maintain a sustainable high quality network which will detect, with high confidence, signals of climate change in the US. It provides the United States with a reference network that meets the requirements of the Global Climate Observing System.

The primary goal of the USCRN is to provide future long-term high-quality observations of surface air temperature and precipitation that can be coupled to past long-term observations for the detection and attribution of present and future climate change. It records data with minimal time dependent biases affecting the interpretation of decadal to centennial climate variability and change.

Background 
This program is used to collect and analyze the high-quality data on climate change. The hope is that research based on this data is thrusted to impact near and long term policy and decision plans made by senior government and business leaders.

It is being implemented and managed by the National Climatic Data Center (NCDC)
located in Asheville, NC. Scientists and engineers from the Atmospheric Turbulence and Diffusion Division located in Oak Ridge, TN, are assisting the NCDC USCRN program staff. System design, test, implementation, and associated expenses are being provided by the National Environmental Satellite, Data, and Information Service's Office of Systems Development.

Stations 
Each station is positioned in a pristine site which is expected to remain free from development over coming decades. Each station may include the following sensors: triple redundant air temperature sensors, precipitation sensors, wind speed sensors, and ground temperature sensors.  Stations have been placed in rural environments in order to avoid possible urban microclimate interference. The contiguous U.S. network of 114 stations was completed in 2008. There are two USCRN stations in Hawaii and deployment of a network of 29 stations in Alaska continues.

Components 
Essential components of the USCRN are well-documented life cycle maintenance, modernization, and performance histories, as well as a robust science and research component. There are routine maintenance visits to the sites and regular calibration of the sensors. Research effort has focused on continual evaluation of the data, new sensors, and emerging calibration techniques. When a new type of sensor can contribute to improving the quality of the observations, there will be at least a one-year continuity overlap of current and new sensors.

Every USCRN instrument site is being equipped with the following:
 a standard set of sensors
 a data logger
 a satellite communications transmitter attached to a typical 10 foot (3 meter) instrument tower
 at least one weighing rain gauge, encircled by a windshield

Data from these USCRN sites are used to provide information on long-term changes in air temperature and precipitation, including means and extremes. Additional sensors may be added in the future, such as soil moisture and soil temperature. USCRN data is intended to be used in operational climate monitoring activities and for placing current climate anomalies into a historical perspective. Data is transmitted hourly via the Geostationary Operational Environmental Satellite Data Collection System and is immediately distributed by the National Weather Service to their operational sites. Observations are accessible through the Internet.

The future of the project 
The USCRN hopes to provide the nation with a long-term (50 to 100 years) observation network that will serve as the Nation's Benchmark Climate Reference Network. When fully implemented, the network will consist of several hundred instrument suites strategically selected to capture climate trends, variations, and change across the nation.

References

External links 

official website

Climatological research organizations
Meteorological instrumentation and equipment
Climate change organizations based in the United States